Samprada Singh (1925 – 27 July 2019) was an Indian businessman, who was the founder and chairman of Alkem Laboratories, which develops, manufactures and markets pharmaceutical formulations and nutraceuticals in India. It has operations in Europe, Africa, the Asia Pacific, South America, the United States and India.

In 2017, Samprada Singh had an estimated net worth of $3.3 billion. He died on 27 July 2019.

Early life and business career
Samprada Singh was born in Okri village, Jehanabad, Bihar.  He graduated from Gaya College, Patna University with Bachelors in Commerce. In 1953 he started a small chemist shop in Patna near PMCH, Patna. Further expanding to medicine distribution business under the banner name of "Magadh Pharma". He founded Alkem Laboratories Ltd along with his younger brother Basudeo Narayan Singh, in 1973 and served as its chairman and his brother is the current executive chairman of Alkem.

Honors and awards 
 In 2009, Pharmaceutical Leadership Summit & Awards founded by Satya Brahma awarded Samprada Singh with a Lifetime Achievement Award for building Alkem as a top Indian Pharma Company.
 In 2017, Samprada Singh received the Ernst and Young 'Entrepreneur of the Year in Healthcare and Life Sciences'.
 In 2017, Samprada Singh was ranked as the 43rd richest man in India by Forbes India rich list.
 In 2018, Samprada Singh was the richest Bihari in India.

References

External links
 Samprada Singh on Forbes India

1925 births
2019 deaths
Businesspeople from Bihar
Patna University alumni
Indian businesspeople in the pharmaceutical industry
People from Jehanabad district
Business-related lists